OUT.FEST – Barreiro International Exploratory Music Festival (“Festival Internacional de Música Exploratória do Barreiro” in Portuguese, generally referred to simply as OUT.FEST) is an annual music festival held in the city of Barreiro, Portugal since 2004. Although predominantly focused on live music, OUT.FEST also regularly presents music and sound art exhibitions, installations and films, as well as music production workshops with some of the artists performing in the festival.

History 

While the festival is always held in Barreiro, the venues used have constantly changed since its inception, with each day of the festival typically being held in a different venue. Many of the sites chosen are often not regularly used for musical events of any sort - for example, the 2017 edition’s first and second days were held in a local church (Igreja de Santa Maria) and an industrial Museum (Museu Industrial da Baía do Tejo) respectively. This itinerancy and use of lesser-known local landmarks and buildings as concert spaces has been one of the hallmarks of the festival, and serves as a way to help both visitors and locals explore the city of Barreiro.

The festival has been nominated for the European Festival Awards and granted the “EFFE - Europe for Festivals, Festivals for Europe” label in recent years. OUT.FEST is also a regular feature in many Portuguese and international publications, being covered by The Wire Magazine, The Quietus, El País, RTP, VICE and Jornal Público, among others. Among the notable artists who have been a part of the festival over the years are The Fall, Panda Bear, William Basinski, Oneohtrix Point Never, Rafael Toral, Evan Parker, James Ferraro, Sei Miguel, Faust and Matana Roberts.

Editions

2004

2005

November

December

2006

November

December

2008

2009

2010

2011

2012

2013

2014

2015

2016

2017

2018

2019

2020 
The festival did not take place in 2020 due to the COVID-19 pandemic.

2021

June

October

References 

Music festivals in Portugal
Barreiro, Portugal
2004 establishments in Portugal
October events